Flight Design General Aviation GmbH (formerly Flight Design GmbH) is a German aircraft design company and aircraft manufacturer, formerly based in Leinfelden-Echterdingen and Kamenz and now in Eisenach.

History
The company started building hang gliders and paragliders in the 1980s, and ultralight aircraft 1993.

The CT series first flew in March 1996 and was put into production in 1997. The aircraft line can be flown under Microlight/Ultralight regulations in many countries and under the Special Light-Sport Aircraft (SLSA) rules in the US and countries that use the ASTM standards for showing compliance. The original engineering and design work was performed in Germany, but production and all assembly of the aircraft was established in Kherson, Ukraine, to lower production costs.

In February 2011, the company announced that it was developing a four-seat design to be designated C4.

In February 2016, the company entered receivership, due to its high debt-load. Lawyer Knut Rebholz, a partner of the law firm Mönning & Partner, became the temporary administrator of the company.

In April 2017, in collaboration with Vessel Co. of South Korea, the company introduced the new KLA-100 low-wing, light aircraft. AOPA editor Jim Moore noted that this had been done while the company was undergoing a financial crisis. However, by June 2018 the design was not listed on the company website as being in production.

In July 2017, the Flight Design-Design organization, the production facility in Kherson, and all rights to the CT series (CTSW, CTLS, CTSL Supralight, CTLSi, CTLE) was acquired by Lift Air, a division of Lift Holding from Eisenach, Germany. The company has since moved to the Kindel Airport, near Eisenach where final inspection, test flights and engineering management are performed. Lars Joerges is the new managing director.

At AERO Friedrichshafen in April 2019, the now-reorganized company announced two new models, the F2 and F4. The F4 will be a four-seat airplane powered by a Rotax 915iS turbocharged engine, while the F2 will be a two-seat European microlight, as a modular design that will include a future electric aircraft variant, to be designated the F2e. Work on the four-seat Flight Design C4 has been stalled, but not abandoned, and it "remains an aspirational product" for the company.

In June 2019 the company manufacturing the CT line, AeroJones Aviation Technology Company, announced plans for a new factory to build the design for the Asian market at the Dalu General Airport in Zhenjiang, China. The plant is expected to be operational by the end of 2019, employ 200-250 people and produce 240 CT aircraft per year.

Following the 2022 Russian invasion of Ukraine, Flight Design temporarily halted operations at the Kherson facility and circulated a letter to Ukrainian staff, announcing plans to expand manufacturing capacities in Czech Republic and offering staff to transfer to the new location.

Aircraft

References

External links

Aircraft manufacturers of Germany
Hang gliders
Companies based in Thuringia